The Sanyo Women's Half Marathon, also known as the Sanyo Women's Road Race, is an annual road running competition for women held in December in Okayama, Japan. It features both a 10K run and half marathon race (21.1 km/13.1 miles). Sanyo Shimbun, a daily newspaper, is the title sponsor for the event.

The day's events previously included an inter-prefectural competition (1985 to 1999) and a junior 3 km race in the 1990s. The half marathon race attracts top level Japanese and Japan-based foreign runners, as well as a smaller number of other international runners. The race is occasionally used as the Japanese women's selection race for the IAAF World Half Marathon Championships. Japanese entrants in both events are mostly collegiate athletes or members of corporate running teams.

The course starts and finishes at Kanko Stadium in the centre of Okayama city. The half marathon is known as the Yuko Arimori Cup, in honour of the two-time Olympic medallist in the marathon, who was born in the city. The 10K is referred to as the Kinue Hitomi Cup in respect of the Okayama-born athlete who won Japan's first ever women's Olympic medal. Typically, the half marathon features about 100 entries and the 10K attracts around 200 runners. The 2011 edition had a record high of 366 entrants into the top level races.

The course record for the half marathon is held by Sally Kaptich Chepyego with her time of 1:08:17 hours set in 2015 – the second time she had broken the record. The 10K record of 31:54 minutes was set in 2007 by Tiki Gelana. Historically, the winners of both races have been Japanese. There were several Chinese winners in the 1990s and since 2000 Kenyan women based in Japan have increasingly reached the top of the podium. Yukiko Akaba is the only runner to win consecutive half marathon titles. Kenyans Chepyego and Evelyn Kimwei and Japan's Mizuki Noguchi (the 2004 Olympic marathon champion) are the only other women to win the race twice.

Past winners
Key:

Half marathon

10K run

References

List of winners
Shigenobu Ota et al. (2013-12-27). Sanyo Women's Half Marathon. Association of Road Racing Statisticians. Retrieved on 2014-02-22.

Road running competitions in Japan
Half marathons
10K runs
Recurring sporting events established in 1982
Sport in Okayama
Women's athletics competitions